Tyronie Rowe is a Jamaican rugby league player for the Washington DC Slayers in the USARL. His position is loose forward. He has previously played for Vauxhall Vultures in Jamaica and also the Hurricanes Rugby League. He is a Jamaican international. and has also played for the Jamaican Rugby 7s team. In 2015 Tyronie played for Jamaica in their 2017 Rugby League World Cup qualifiers.

References

Living people
Hurricanes Rugby League players
Jamaica international rugby union players
Jamaica national rugby league team players
Jamaican rugby league players
Jamaican rugby union players
Vauxhall Vultures players
Washington DC Slayers players
Year of birth missing (living people)